Torbat-e Jam is an Afghan refugee camp in eastern Iran, established around 1998.  The camp, as of 2008, housed 5,000 Afghan refugees on a 100-hectare compound of permanent brick housing, schools and clinics, and a mosque.

United Nations High Commissioner for Refugees António Guterres visited the camp in late 2008 and described it as " probably the best refugee settlement in Iran, if not the world."

References

Afghan refugee camps
Refugee camps in Iran